Methanesulfonyl chloride (mesyl chloride) is an organosulfur compound with the formula . Using the organic pseudoelement symbol Ms for the methanesulfonyl (or mesyl) group –, it is frequently abbreviated MsCl in reaction schemes or equations. It is a colourless liquid that dissolves in polar organic solvents but is reactive toward water, alcohols, and many amines. The simplest organic sulfonyl chloride, it is used to make methanesulfonates and to generate the elusive molecule sulfene (methylenedioxosulfur(VI)).

Preparation
It is manufactured by the reaction of methane and sulfuryl chloride in a radical reaction:

Another method of manufacture entails chlorination of methanesulfonic acid with thionyl chloride or phosgene:

Reactions
Methanesulfonyl chloride is a precursor to many compounds because it is highly reactive. It is an electrophile, functioning as a source of the "CH3SO2+" group.

Methanesulfonates
Methanesulfonyl chloride is mainly used to give methanesulfonates by its reaction with alcohols in the presence of a non-nucleophilic base. In contrast to the formation of toluenesulfonates from alcohols and p-toluenesulfonyl chloride in the presence of pyridine, the formation of methanesulfonates is believed to proceed via a mechanism wherein methanesulfonyl chloride first undergoes an E1cb elimination to generate the highly reactive parent sulfene, followed by attack by the alcohol and rapid proton transfer to generate the observed product. This mechanistic proposal is supported by isotope labeling experiments and the trapping of the transient sulfene as cycloadducts.

Methanesulfonates are used as intermediates in substitution reactions, elimination reactions, reductions, and rearrangement reactions. When treated with a Lewis acid, oxime methanesulfonates undergo facile Beckmann rearrangement.

Methanesulfonates are occasionally used as a protecting group for alcohols. They are stable to acidic conditions and is cleaved back to the alcohol using sodium amalgam.

Methanesulfonamides
Methanesulfonyl chloride react with primary and secondary amines to give methanesulfonamides. Unlike methanesulfonates, methanesulfonamides are very resistant toward hydrolysis under both acidic and basic conditions. When used as a protecting group, they can be converted back to amines using lithium aluminium hydride or a dissolving metal reduction.

Addition to alkynes
In the presence of copper(II) chloride, methanesulfonyl chloride will add across alkynes to form β-chloro sulfones.

Formation of heterocycles
Upon treatment with a base, such as triethylamine, methanesulfonyl chloride will undergo an elimination to form sulfene. Sulfene can undergo cycloadditions to form various heterocycles. α-Hydroxyketones react with sulfene to form five-membered sultones.

Miscellaneous
Forming acyliminium ions from α-hydroxyamides can be done using methanesulfonyl chloride and a base, typically triethylamine.

Safety
Methanesulfonyl chloride is highly toxic by inhalation, corrosive, and acts as a lachrymator. It reacts with nucleophilic reagents (including water) in a strongly exothermic manner. When heated to decomposition point, it emits toxic vapors of sulfur oxides and hydrogen chloride.

References

Reagents for organic chemistry
Sulfonyl halides